Gholam hossein Davani (Persian: غلامحسین دوانی) (born July 16, 1953) is an Iranian accountant, who has made many contributions to academic and professional activities in Iran and worldwide.

Life and work 

There are several sites referring to the same entity as  " Gholamhossein Davani" with a lot of memberships to so many organization such as IACPA, IICA, IMA, AAA, BAA, EAA, IIA, AFA,CAAA, and CFE. 
 1 -  https://www.slideserve.com/raleigh/auditors-responsibilities-on-globalization. 2- http://www.aafm.us/publicationsb97c.html?cat=30. 3- https://web.archive.org/web/20180422062441/https://vdocuments.mx/documents/1-challenge-of-money-laundry-bydrgholamhossein-davani-chairman-of-dayarayan.html. 4 - http://waccounting.blogspot.ca/. 5 - http://www.theiafm.org/publications/288_CorporateGovernanceinIran.pdf.
https://www.amazon.ca/Social-Accounting-Theory-Approach-Globalisation/dp/6200086273

Publications
 Globalisation, Global Corporations and Global Government, LAP LAMBERT Academic Publishing, October 27, 2014.
(/store/gb/book/978-3-659-62091-1/globalisation,-global-corporations-and-global-government)
https://www.amazon.ca/Globalisation-Global-Corporations-Government/dp/3659620912
.. World Future "rise and Fall of Top Economic Power in 2060", LAP Lambert Academic Publishing , December 13, 2014.
(/store/gb/book/978-3-659-68006-9/world-future-%E2%80%9C-rise-and-fall-of-top-economic-power-in-2060%E2%80%9D)
Articles, chapters etc:
https://market.yandex.ru/product--gholam-hossein-davani-world-future-rise-and-fall-of-top-economic-power-in-2060/12590274/spec
 Gholam hossein Davani & Zabihollah Rezaee. "Iran," in: A Global History of Accounting, Financial Reporting and Public Policy, Gary J. Previts eds.
https://www.amazon.com/Iran-Direct-Taxation-Act-Management/dp/6137388190
https://www.bookdepository.com/World-Wealth-World-Debt-World-Corporation-Gholamhossein-Davani/9786137388785
http://www.memphis.edu/accountancy/faculty/zrezaee.php

Living people
Iranian accountants
People from Abadan, Iran
1953 births